Rudloff is a German surname.

Origin and meaning 
"Rudloff" derives the name Rudolf by metathesis. It combines the Old High German words "hruod" (meaning "fame" or "glory") and "wolf" (meaning "wolf").

People with the surname
Cornelia Rudloff-Schäffer (b. 1957), German judge and president of the German Patent and Trade Mark Office
Gregg Rudloff (1955–2019), American sound engineer
Jan-Peter Rudloff, German arachnologist 
Marcel Rudloff (1923–1996), Alsatian lawyer and politician, member of French Senate and mayor of Strasbourg
Tex Rudloff (1926–2015), American sound engineer
Erik Bongcam-Rudloff (b. 1957), Scientist
 Roger Rudloff (b. 1973), Dallas Texas Sergeant of Police

Notes

German-language surnames